{{safesubst:#invoke:RfD|||month = March
|day =  3
|year = 2023
|time = 18:39
|timestamp = 20230303183948

|content=
REDIRECT Intergenerational equity

}}